DJ Trexx is a pseudonym of Swedish actor, producer and writer Michael Lindgren (born 14 March 1978 in Stockholm), who is a part of the Grotesco comedy collective. DJ Trexx is a satirical figure who was initially portrayed as a Croatian disc jockey who performs kitschy eurotechno songs, but has also at times appeared to be Russian. In the finals of Melodifestivalen 2009, DJ Trexx performed a version of the song "Tingeling", which had been a recurring theme of several comical between-acts performed by the Grotesco team in that year's episodes of Melodifestivalen. The song "Tingaliin", the Russian version of "Tingeling" was released as a single and hit number one on Sverigetopplistan in March 2009.

DJ Trexx was also commissioned for the song A Union of Peace Love and Bass to encourage young voters to vote in the 2009 European Parliament election.

In 2021, he appeared as part of sketch in the Andra Chansen round of Swedish Eurovision selection Melodifestivalen.

References

External links
 https://web.archive.org/web/20090531054647/http://djtrexx.eu/
 DJ Trexx - A Union of Peace, Love and Bass - GrotescoGlobal channel on YouTube.

Swedish DJs
Swedish male actors
1978 births
Living people
Swedish male writers
Electronic dance music DJs